Sasuli (also Romanized as Sāsūlī; also known as Deh-e Sāsūlī and Sālsūlī) is a village in Dust Mohammad Rural District, in the Central District of Hirmand County, Sistan and Baluchestan Province, Iran. At the 2006 census, its population was 568, in 115 families.

References 

Populated places in Hirmand County